The 1st London Trophy was a Formula Two motor race held on 19 September 1953 at Crystal Palace Circuit, London. The race was run over two heats of 10 laps with the winner being decided by aggregate time.

Stirling Moss in a Cooper T24-Alta and Tony Rolt in a Connaught Type A-Lea Francis were first and second in both heats and on aggregate time. Bob Gerard in a Cooper T23-Bristol was third in the first heat and Ron Flockhart in a Connaught Type A was third in the second heat, and set fastest lap, but neither performed well in the other heat, and Horace Gould in a Cooper T23 was placed third.

Entries

1Wharton DNA

Results

Heats

Aggregate

References 

London Trophy
London Trophy